Ernest Gregor Small (5 November 1888 – 27 December 1944) was an admiral in the United States Navy during World War II.

Biography
Small was born in Waltham, Massachusetts, on 5 November 1888. He graduated from the United States Naval Academy and received his commission as ensign on 7 June 1912. From 1940–42 he headed the Ordnance and Gunnery Department at the Naval Academy.

On 10 April 1942 he assumed command of Salt Lake City (CA-25) and was subsequently awarded the Navy Cross for extraordinary heroism for his conning of the cruiser against Japanese surface units off Savo Island, 11–12 October 1942 in the Battle of Cape Esperance. From January to August 1943 he served eminently as war plans officer on the staff of the Commander-in-Chief, Pacific Fleet. He spent the next year in distinguished performance as Commander Cruiser Division 5. Rear Admiral Small died in Brooklyn, New York on 27 December 1944.

Namesake
In 1945, the destroyer USS Ernest G. Small (DD-838) was named in his honor.

See also

References

1888 births
1944 deaths
United States Navy admirals
United States Naval Academy alumni
Recipients of the Navy Cross (United States)
People from Waltham, Massachusetts
United States Navy World War II admirals
Military personnel from Massachusetts